Maurice River Township is the easternmost township in Cumberland County, in the U.S. state of New Jersey. It is part of the Vineland-Bridgeton metropolitan statistical area for statistical purposes. As of the 2020 United States census, the township's population was 6,218, a decrease of 1,758 (−22.0%) from the 2010 census count of 7,976, which in turn reflected an increase of 1,048 (+15.1%) from the 6,928 counted in the 2000 census.

Maurice River Township was first formed as a precinct on January 19, 1748, and was incorporated by an act of the New Jersey Legislature on February 21, 1798, as one of New Jersey's initial group of 104 townships. Portions of the township were taken to form Millville on March 1, 1866. The township derives its name from Maurice, Prince of Orange.

It is a dry town where alcohol cannot legally be sold.

History
Originally called Wahatquenak by the local Lenni Lenape Native Americans, the Maurice River is said to be named for a local legend, in which a Dutch ship on the river, the Prince Maurice, was sunk by the local Native Americans in 1657. The land was surveyed by John Worledge and Thomas Budd, and the community of Dorchester was laid out. It was not until 1798 on that the township itself was established.

Port Elizabeth was established as a port of delivery by an Act of Congress in 1789, and trade was done directly with the West Indies until the 1830s, when trading was done more with Philadelphia, Pennsylvania and New York City. Dorchester and Leesburg were known for shipbuilding industry, and the A.J. Meerwald (the State Ship of New Jersey) was built in the shipyards of Dorchester. The settlement of Heislerville and its surroundings were known for their oystering industry until around 1957, when a parasitic disease called MSX crippled the oyster population of the river. The oystering industry has not recovered since.

Geography

According to the United States Census Bureau, Maurice River township had a total area of 95.90 square miles (248.38 km2), including 93.17 square miles (241.30 km2) of land and 2.73 square miles (7.08 km2) of water (2.85%).

Unincorporated communities, localities and place names located partially or completely within the township include Bennetts Mill, Bricksboro, Cannon Range, Cumberland, Delmont, Dorchester, East Point, Fries Mill, Halberton, Hands Mill, Heislerville, Hesstown, Hoffmans Mill, Hunters Mill, Jones Mill, Leesburg, Manantico, Manumuskin, Menhaden, Moores Beach, Ormond, Port Elizabeth, Thompsons Beach, Wall Pond, and some portions of Belleplain and Milmay. The township government is based in the community of Leesburg in the municipal complex. Maurice River Township is mostly rural in character and some of the land is covered by extensive forests of the Pine Barrens.

Maurice River Township borders the municipalities of Commercial Township, Millville and Vineland in Cumberland County; Buena Vista Township, Estell Manor and Weymouth Township in Atlantic County; and Dennis Township and Upper Township in Cape May County.

Demographics

2010 census

The Census Bureau's 2006–2010 American Community Survey showed that (in 2010 inflation-adjusted dollars) median household income was $69,419 (with a margin of error of +/− $9,253) and the median family income was $78,713 (+/− $7,665). Males had a median income of $54,893 (+/− $8,742) versus $33,712 (+/− $6,439) for females. The per capita income for the borough was $15,705 (+/− $1,946). About 9.5% of families and 9.7% of the population were below the poverty line, including 12.8% of those under age 18 and 6.9% of those age 65 or over.

2000 census
As of the 2000 United States census there were 6,928 people, 1,332 households, and 1,012 families residing in the township. There were 1,461 housing units at an average density of 15.6 per square mile (6.0/km2). The racial makeup of the township was 98.63% White, 3.98% African American, 0.78% Native American, 0.27% Asian, 11.1% Pacific Islander, 9.43% from other races, and 2.89% from two or more races. Hispanic or Latino of any race were 9.15% of the population.

There were 1,332 households, out of which 31.1% had children under the age of 18 living with them, 59.1% were married couples living together, 10.3% had a female householder with no husband present, and 24.0% were non-families. 19.4% of all households were made up of individuals, and 8.2% had someone living alone who was 65 years of age or older.  The average household size was 2.68 and the average family size was 3.03.

In the township the population was spread out, with 12.9% under the age of 18, 5.3% from 18 to 24, 55.1% from 25 to 44, 20.3% from 45 to 64, and 6.4% who were 65 years of age or older.  The median age was 36 years. For every 100 females, there were 277.5 males.  For every 100 females age 18 and over, there were 343.8 males.

The median income for a household in the township was $43,182, and the median income for a family was $46,987. Males had a median income of $37,901 versus $27,928 for females. The per capita income for the township was $17,141.  About 6.4% of families and 8.1% of the population were below the poverty line, including 11.3% of those under age 18 and 6.9% of those age 65 or over.

Parks and recreation
In 1993, the Maurice River and its tributaries were designated as the Maurice National Scenic and Recreational River by the Congress.

Acres of unspoiled forest and waterways allow residents to enjoy outdoor activities year-round. With an abundance of forests and marshlands, numerous state wildlife refuges in the area are frequented by locals for hunting, fishing, bird-watching, hiking and boating.

The preservation of the unique ecosystem of the Maurice River watershed has become an important issue for some residents.  One group, Citizens United to Protect the Maurice River and Its Tributaries, Inc. was formed in 1979 to provide education and organize preservation efforts.

Government

Local government 
Maurice River Township is governed under the Township form of New Jersey municipal government, one of 141 municipalities (of the 564) statewide that use this form, the second-most commonly used form of government in the state. The governing body is comprised of a three-member Township Committee, whose members are elected directly by the voters at-large in partisan elections to serve three-year terms of office on a staggered basis, with one seat coming up for election each year as part of the November general election in a three-year cycle. At an annual reorganization meeting, the Township Committee selects one of its members to serve as Mayor.

, members of the Maurice River Township Committee are Mayor Ken Whildin (D, term on committee and as mayor ends December 31, 2022), Deputy Mayor William Ashton (R, term as committee member ends 2024; term as deputy mayor ends 2022) and Joseph Sterling (R, 2023).

Federal, state and county representation
Maurice River Township is located in the 2nd Congressional District and is part of New Jersey's 1st state legislative district.

State facilities
Two New Jersey Department of Corrections prisons, the Bayside State Prison and the Southern State Correctional Facility are located in the township.

Politics

As of March 23, 2011, there were a total of 2,329 registered voters in Maurice River Township, of which 574 (24.6%) were registered as Democrats, 595 (25.5%) were registered as Republicans and 1,157 (49.7%) were registered as Unaffiliated. There were 3 voters registered as Libertarians or Greens.

In the 2012 presidential election, Republican Mitt Romney received 55.5% of the vote (810 cast), ahead of Democrat Barack Obama with 42.9% (627 votes), and other candidates with 1.6% (23 votes), among the 1,482 ballots cast by the township's 2,394 registered voters (22 ballots were spoiled), for a turnout of 61.9%. In the 2008 presidential election, Republican John McCain received 56.3% of the vote (906 cast), ahead of Democrat Barack Obama, who received 39.9% (642 votes), with 1,610 ballots cast among the township's 2,355 registered voters, for a turnout of 68.4%. In the 2004 presidential election, Republican George W. Bush received 57.7% of the vote (889 ballots cast), outpolling Democrat John Kerry, who received 39.8% (614 votes), with 1,541 ballots cast among the township's 2,322 registered voters, for a turnout percentage of 66.4.

In the 2013 gubernatorial election, Republican Chris Christie received 67.4% of the vote (621 cast), ahead of Democrat Barbara Buono with 30.3% (279 votes), and other candidates with 2.3% (21 votes), among the 952 ballots cast by the township's 2,225 registered voters (31 ballots were spoiled), for a turnout of 42.8%. In the 2009 gubernatorial election, Republican Chris Christie received 46.0% of the vote (533 ballots cast), ahead of both Democrat Jon Corzine with 40.3% (467 votes) and Independent Chris Daggett with 8.1% (94 votes), with 1,158 ballots cast among the township's 2,335 registered voters, yielding a 49.6% turnout.

Education
The Maurice River Township School District serves public school students in pre-kindergarten through eighth grade at Maurice River Township Elementary School. As of the 2018–19 school year, the district, comprised of one school, had an enrollment of 406 students and 34.0 classroom teachers (on an FTE basis), for a student–teacher ratio of 11.9:1.

In the 2007–08 school year, Maurice River Township Elementary School was one of three schools statewide to be designated as a "School to Watch" by the New Jersey Department of Education. Despite this honor, it was one of several schools targeted for closure as part of a plan by the NJ Department of Education that would close and consolidate small school districts within a three-year period. Students at Maurice River Township Elementary School would have been bused to a larger regional school within Cumberland County. By May 2010, the plan had been shelved in the face of inadequate funding to implement the proposal.

Students in ninth through twelfth grades for public school attend high school in Millville together with students from Commercial Township, Lawrence Township and Woodbine, as part of a sending/receiving relationship with the Millville Public Schools. Students attend
Memorial High School for grades 9 and half of 10th with 701 students and 
Millville Senior High School for grades 10–12 with 1,107 students.

Students are also eligible to attend Cumberland County Technology Education Center in Vineland, serving students from the entire county in its full-time technical training programs, which are offered without charge to students who are county residents.

Transportation

Roads and highways

Maurice River Township is located about a one-hour drive from both Philadelphia, Pennsylvania and Atlantic City.

Major roads that pass through include Route 47, Route 49 and Route 55 (a limited access road) and Route 347. Also, County Routes 548, 550 and 552 all pass through.

Public transportation
NJ Transit offers service on the 313 route between Cape May and Philadelphia.

Notable people

People who were born in, residents of, or otherwise closely associated with Maurice River Township include:

 Merritt Gant (born 1971), former guitarist of heavy metal bands Overkill and Faith or Fear
 Mike Lafferty (born 1975) Enduro motorcycle champion
 Andy Lapihuska (1922–1996), MLB pitcher who played for the Philadelphia Phillies
 Thomas Lee (1780–1856), represented New Jersey at large in the United States House of Representatives from 1833 to 1837

References

External links

Maurice River Township website
Cumberland County webpage for Maurice River Township
Maurice River Township School

School Data for the Maurice River Township School District, National Center for Education Statistics
More on MSX disease

 
1748 establishments in New Jersey
Populated places in the Pine Barrens (New Jersey)
Populated places established in 1748
Township form of New Jersey government
Townships in Cumberland County, New Jersey